Davide Amadori (born 18 July 1992) is an Italian footballer who plays as a goalkeeper for Vigevano.

References

External links

1992 births
Living people
Footballers from Milan
Italian footballers
Association football goalkeepers
A.C. Renate players
Venezia F.C. players
Vigevano Calcio players